Ceclavín is a municipality located in the province of Cáceres, Extremadura, Spain. According to the 2005 census (INE), the municipality has a population of 2115 inhabitants.

People from Ceclavín 
 Alejandro Rodríguez Arias (1838-1893). Captain General and Gobernor of Cuba (1892-1893).
 Elisa Herrero Uceda (b.1957) - She is a Spanish writer. She is committed to the defence of the environment and the conservation of popular traditional culture.
 Miguel Herrero Uceda (b.1964) - He is a writer, lecturer and natural scientist. 
 Mercedes Vostell (b.1933) is a Spanish writer.

References

Municipalities in the Province of Cáceres